A house husband is a husband who stays at home, as a homemaker, and frequently, a father.

House husband, househusband, or variation, may also refer to:

Television
 House Husbands (TV show), Australian TV show
 Mr. House Husband (TV show), a South Korean TV show
 "House Husband" (episode), a 2017 TV episode of Maynila; see List of Maynila episodes
 "The Househusband", an episode of Fokus Deutsch

Other uses
 My House Husband (film), a 2011 Philippine dramedy film
 Bad Housewife (film), a 2005 South Korean film also released as "House Husband"
 "House Husband" (song), a 2002 song by Prick off the album The Wreckard
 "House Husband" (song), a 1999 song by Shabba Ranks off the album Golden Touch (album)
 The House Husband (book), a 1996 novel by Norma Curtis
 The House Husband (book), a 2017 novel by James Patterson; see James Patterson bibliography

See also

 The Way of the Househusband, a Japanese manga comic book
 Hausmann, a surname meaning househusband
 

 
 work husband
 ex-husband
 housewife
 Husband (disambiguation)
 House (disambiguation)